The Johannesburg Beth Din is the Beth Din (Court of Jewish Law) of the Union of Orthodox Synagogues of South Africa. It serves Jews throughout South Africa and other countries on the continent.

The focus of the Beth Din is on areas of family law, divorce and conversion, as well as adjudication of financial disputes. Other areas supervised by the Beth Din are: Circumcision, Stam, Mikvaot and Eruvin.

In 2004, the High Court of South Africa upheld a cherem (excommunication edict) against a Johannesburg businessman because he refused to pay his former wife alimony as ordered by The Johannesburg Beth Din. The case, because of its potential implications with regard to the interaction of religious and state law, elicited global interest.

Dayanim 
Current members of the Beth Din are:
 Dayan Dovid Baddiel
 Dayan Yoel Smith
 Dayan Gidon Fox

Former Dayanim 
Former members of the Beth Din include:
 Dayan Yitzchak Kossowsky
 Dayan Michel Kossowsky
 Dayan Yisrael Soloveitchik
 Dayan Shlomo  Rosenzweig
 Dayan A H Lapin
 Dayan I Aloy
 Dayan Dr Dennis Isaacs
 Dayan Moshe Kurtstag (Rosh Beth Din)
 Dayan Baruch Rapoport
 Dayan Zadok Suchard
 Dayan Shlomo Glicksberg

References 

Jewish courts and civil law
Jewish marital law
Jews and Judaism in Johannesburg
Orthodox Judaism in South Africa